Essa Obaid may refer to:

 Essa Obaid (footballer) (born 1984), United Arab Emirates footballer
 Essa Obaid (bodybuilder) (born 1979), United Arab Emirates bodybuilder